Following World War I there were two Treaties of Rapallo, both named after Rapallo, a resort on the Ligurian coast of Italy:

 Treaty of Rapallo, 1920, an agreement between Italy and the Kingdom of the Serbs, Croats and Slovenes (the later Yugoslavia) for the independence of the state of Fiume (now the Croatian city of Rijeka) and Italian renunciation of claims to Dalmatia except to the city of Zara (now Zadar, also in Croatia)
 Treaty of Rapallo, 1922, an agreement between Germany and Soviet Russia on the renunciation of claims arising from World War I